This is a list of the accepted names of Epidendrum orchids. It is a large list, containing over 1,100 species.

Epidendrum L., (1763).

A 

 Epidendrum abbottii L.Sánchez & Hágsater, (2001).
 Epidendrum acreense (Brieger & Bicalho) Christenson, (1991).
 Epidendrum acrobatesii Hágsater & Dodson, (2001).
 Epidendrum acrorhodum Hágsater & Dodson, (2001).
 Epidendrum acrostigma Hágsater & García-Cruz, (1999).
 Epidendrum acuminatum Ruiz & Pav., (1798).
 Epidendrum acutissimum Lindl., (1853).
 Epidendrum adamsii Hágsater & Dodson, (1993).
 Epidendrum addae Pabst, (1972).
 Epidendrum adenoglossum Lindl., (1841).
 Epidendrum adnatum Ames & C.Schweinf., (1925).
 Epidendrum adolfomorenoi R.Vásquez & Ibisch, (2003).
 Epidendrum agathosmicum Rchb.f., (1850).
 Epidendrum aggregatum Lindl., (1841).
 Epidendrum agoyanense Hágsater & Dodson, (1993).
 Epidendrum aguaricoense Hágsater & Dodson, (2001).
 Epidendrum aguirrei Hágsater, (1999).
 Epidendrum alabastrialatum Pollard ex Hágsater (1978).
 Epidendrum albertii Schltr., (1923) : Albert's Epidendrum
 Epidendrum albifloroides D.E.Benn. & Christenson, (1998) : White-flowered Epidendrum
 Epidendrum albiforum Schltr., (1913).
 Epidendrum albomarginatum Rchb.f., (1877).
 Epidendrum alexii Hágsater & Dodson, (1993).
 Epidendrum alfredii Schltr., (1923).
 Epidendrum allenii L.O.Williams, (1941).
 Epidendrum allisonii Hágsater & Dodson, (2001).
 Epidendrum allochronum Hágsater, (1993).
 Epidendrum alopecurum Schltr., (1929).
 Epidendrum alpicolonigrense Hágsater & Dodson, (2001).
 Epidendrum alpicoloscandens Hágsater & Dodson, (2001).
 Epidendrum alpicolum Rchb.f., (1854).
 Epidendrum althausenii A.D.Hawkes, (1957).
 Epidendrum alticola Ames & Correll, (1942).
 Epidendrum alvarezdeltoroi Hágsater, (2001).
 Epidendrum amapense Hágsater & L.Sánchez, (1993).
 Epidendrum amayense Hágsater, (1999).
 Epidendrum amazonicoriifolium Hágsater, (2001).
 Epidendrum amblostomoides Hoehne, (1938) : Amblostoma-like Epidendrum
 Epidendrum amethystinum Rchb.f., (1867).
 Epidendrum ammophilum Barb.Rodr., (1881).
 Epidendrum amparoanum Schltr., (1923).
 Epidendrum amphistomum A.Rich. in R.de la Sagra, (1850).
 Epidendrum amplexicaule Lindl., (1853).
 Epidendrum amplexigastrium Hágsater & Dodson, (1999).
 Epidendrum ampliracemum C.Schweinf., (1952).
 Epidendrum amplum D.E.Benn. & Christenson, (1998).
 Epidendrum anastasioi Hágsater, (1993).
 Epidendrum anatipedium L.M.Sánchez & Hágsater, (1993).

 Epidendrum anceps Jacq., (1763) : Brown Epidendrum
 Epidendrum anchinocturnum Hágsater, (1999).
 Epidendrum anderssonii Hágsater & Dodson, (1993).
 Epidendrum andinum Carnevali & G.A.Romero in G.A.Romero & G.Carnevali, (2000).
 Epidendrum andrei Hágsater & L.Sánchez, (1999).
 Epidendrum angaritae Hágsater, (1999).
 Epidendrum angustatum (T.Hashim.) Dodson, (1993).
 Epidendrum angustilobopaniculatum Hágsater & Dodson, (2001).
 Epidendrum angustilobum Fawc. & Rendle, (1909).
 Epidendrum angustisegmentum (L.O.Williams) Hágsater, (1999).
 Epidendrum angustissimum Lindl., (1853).
 Epidendrum anisatum Lex. in P.de La Llave & J.M.de Lexarza, (1825).
 Epidendrum anitae Schltr., (1924).
 Epidendrum annabellae Nir, (1994) : Annabell's Epidendrum
 Epidendrum anoglossoides Ames & C.Schweinf., (1930).
 Epidendrum anoglossum Schltr., (1911).
 Epidendrum anthoceroides Hágsater & Dodson, (2001).
 Epidendrum anthoceros Linden & Rchb.f., (1854).
 Epidendrum anthropophorum Rchb.f., (1856).
 Epidendrum antillanum Ackerman & Hágsater, (1992).
 Epidendrum antonense Hágsater, (1993).
 Epidendrum apaganoides D.E.Benn. & Christenson, (1998) : Apaganum-like Epidendrum
 Epidendrum apaganum Mansf., (1928).
 Epidendrum aporoides F.Lehm. & Kraenzl., (1899).
 Epidendrum appendiculatum T.Hashim., (1987).
 Epidendrum aquaticoides C.Schweinf., (1943).
 Epidendrum aquaticum Lindl., (1843).
 Epidendrum arachnoglossum Rchb.f. ex André, (1882).
 Epidendrum arbuscula Lindl. in G.Bentham, (1842) : Tree-like Epidendrum
 Epidendrum ardens Kraenzl., (1906).
 Epidendrum arevaloi (Schltr.) Hágsater in R.Escobar (ed.),  (1991).
 Epidendrum aristatum Ackerman & Montalvo, (1986).
 Epidendrum aristisepalum Hágsater & Dodson, (2001).
 Epidendrum aristoloides Hágsater & Dodson, (2001).
 Epidendrum armeniacum Lindl., (1836) : Orange Epidendrum
 Epidendrum arnoldii Schltr., (1924).
 Epidendrum asplundii Hágsater & Dodson, (2001).
 Epidendrum atacazoicum Schltr., (1921).
 Epidendrum atrobrunneum Schltr., (1924).
 Epidendrum atrorugosum Hágsater, (1999).
 Epidendrum atroscriptum Hágsater, (1993).
 Epidendrum attenuatum Lindl., (1853).
 Epidendrum atwoodchlamys Hágsater, (1999).
 Epidendrum atwoodii Hágsater & L.Sánchez, (1999).
 Epidendrum aurigineum Barringer, (1991 publ. 1992).
 Epidendrum avicula Lindl., (1841).
 Epidendrum azulense D.E.Benn. & Christenson, (1998).

B 

 Epidendrum badium Hágsater, (1993).
 Epidendrum baezense Hágsater & Dodson, (1993).
 Epidendrum bahorucense Hágsater & L.Cerv., (2001).
 Epidendrum bakrense Hágsater & G.Cremers, (1999).
 Epidendrum bambusaceum Schltr., (1921).
 Epidendrum bambusiforme Kraenzl., (1916).
 Epidendrum bangii Rolfe, (1907).  Subgenus Epidendrum Lindl. Section Planifolia Rchb.f. Subsection Spathacea Reichenbach (Rchb.f. p. 401 as E. macrostachyum Lindl. (1845) nom. illeg.)
 Epidendrum barbae Rchb.f., (1866).
 Epidendrum barbaricum Hágsater & Dodson, (2001).
 Epidendrum barbeyanum Kraenzl., (1895) : Barbey-Boissier's Epidendrum
 Epidendrum batesii Dodson, (1980).
 Epidendrum baumannianum Schltr., (1920).
 Epidendrum beharorum Hágsater, (1993).
 Epidendrum belloi Hágsater, (1999).
 Epidendrum bennettii Dodson, (1989).
 Epidendrum betimianum Barb.Rodr., (1881).
 Epidendrum bianthogastrium Hágsater & Dodson, (2001).
 Epidendrum bicirrhatum D.E.Benn. & Christenson, (1998).
 Epidendrum bidens D.E.Benn. & Christenson, (2001).
 Epidendrum bifalce Schltr., (1921).
 Epidendrum bifarium Sw., (1799). Subgenus Euepidendrum Lindl. Section Planifolia Rchb.f. Subsection Spathacea Rchb.f. (Reichenbach, p. 401)
 Epidendrum biforatum Lindl., (1844).
 Epidendrum bilobatum Ames, (1924).
 Epidendrum birostratum C.Schweinf., (1943).
 Epidendrum bisulcatum Ames, (1923).
 Epidendrum bivalve Lindl., (1853) : Two-folded Epidendrum
 Epidendrum blancheanum Urb., (1922) : Acuna's Star Orchid
 Epidendrum blepharichilum Kraenzl., (1916).
 Epidendrum blepharistes Barker ex Lindl., (1844).
 Epidendrum blepharoclinium Rchb.f., (1876).
 Epidendrum bogotense Schltr., (1924).
 Epidendrum boissierianum Schltr., (1918).
 Epidendrum bolbophylloides F.Lehm. & Kraenzl., (1899).
 Epidendrum bolivianum Schltr., (1912).
 Epidendrum bonitense Hágsater & Dodson, (1993).
 Epidendrum borchsenii Hágsater & Dodson, (2001).
 Epidendrum boricuarum Hágsater & L.Sánchez, (1993) : Fleshy Star Orchid
 Epidendrum boscoense Hágsater & Dodson, (2001).
 Epidendrum boylei Hágsater & Dodson, (2001).
 Epidendrum braccigerum Rchb.f., (1877).
 Epidendrum brachybotrys Ackerman & Montalvo, (1986).
 Epidendrum brachybulbum F.Lehm. & Kraenzl., (1899).
 Epidendrum brachyclinium Hágsater & García-Cruz, (1999).
 Epidendrum brachycorymbosum Hágsater & Dodson 2004: Short-corymb Epidendrum
 Epidendrum brachyglossum Lindl., (1844).
 Epidendrum brachyrepens Hágsater, (1999).
 Epidendrum brachyschistum Schltr., (1924).
 Epidendrum brachystele Schltr., (1916).
 Epidendrum bracteolatum C.Presl, (1827) : Small-bracted Epidendrum
 Epidendrum bracteostigma Hágsater & García-Cruz, (1999).
 Epidendrum bracteosum Ames & C.Schweinf., (1930).
 Epidendrum bractiacuminatum Hágsater & Dodson, (1999).
 Epidendrum brassivoliforme F.Lehm. & Kraenzl., (1899).
 Epidendrum brenesii Schltr. (1923).
 Epidendrum brevicaule Schltr., Repert. (1921).
 Epidendrum brevicernuum Hágsater & Dodson, (2001).
 Epidendrum brevivenioides Hágsater & Dodson, (2001).
 Epidendrum brevivenium Lindl., (1853).
 Epidendrum bryophilum Hágsater & Dodson, (2001).
 Epidendrum bucararicense Kraenzl., (1920).
 Epidendrum buchtienii Schltr., (1912).
 Epidendrum bugabense Hágsater, (1993).
 Epidendrum bungerothii Schltr., (1924).
 Epidendrum burtonii D.E.Benn. & Christenson, (2001).

C 

 Epidendrum caeciliae P.Ortiz & Hágsater (2005)
 Epidendrum calacaliense Hágsater & Dodson, 4 (2001).
 Epidendrum calagrense Hágsater & Dodson, (2001).

 Epidendrum calanthum Rchb.f. & Warsz., (1854) : Beautiful-blooming Epidendrum. Subgen. Amphiglottium, Sect. Schistochila, Subs. Carinata (Reichenbach, p. 390)
 Epidendrum caldense Barb.Rodr., (1881).
 Epidendrum callobotrys Kraenzl., (1911).
 Epidendrum caloglossum Schltr., (1921).
 Epidendrum caluerorum Hágsater, (1993).
 Epidendrum calyptratoides Hágsater & Dodson, (2001).
 Epidendrum calyptratum F.Lehm. & Kraenzl., (1899).
 Epidendrum campaccii Hágsater & L.Sánchez, (1993) : Campacci's Epidendrum
 Epidendrum campbellstigma Hágsater & García-Cruz, (1999).

 Epidendrum campestre Lindl., (1844) :  Savanah Epidendrum
 Epidendrum camposii Hágsater, (1993).
 Epidendrum campyloglossum P.Ortiz & Hágsater, (1999).
 Epidendrum cancanae (P.Ortiz) Hágsater (2005) (formerly Oerstedella cancanae)
 Epidendrum candelabrum Hágsater, (1988).
 Epidendrum capitellatum C.Schweinf., (1943).
 Epidendrum capricornu Kraenzl., (1916) : Goat-horned Epidendrum
 Epidendrum caquetanum Schltr., (1924).
 Epidendrum carchiense Hágsater & Dodson, (1993) : Carchi Epidendrum
 Epidendrum cardenasii Hágsater, (1999).
 Epidendrum cardiochilum L.O.Williams, (1940) : Heart-shaped Lip Epidendrum
 Epidendrum cardioglossum Rchb.f., (1850).
 Epidendrum cardiophyllum Kraenzl., (1906).
 Epidendrum carmelense Hágsater & Dodson,  (1993).
 Epidendrum carnevalii Hágsater & L.Sánchez, (1999).
 Epidendrum carnosiflorum C.Schweinf., (1943).
 Epidendrum carolii Schltr., Repert. Spec. (1923) : Carol's Epidendrum
 Epidendrum cartilaginiflorum Rchb.f., (1878).
 Epidendrum carvalhoi Toscano, (2000).
 Epidendrum catillus Rchb.f. & Warsz., (1854).  Subgen. Amphiglottium, Sect. Schistochila, Subs. Tuberculata (Reichenbach, p. 393)
 Epidendrum cauliflorum Lindl., (1838).
 Epidendrum caurense Carnevali & G.A.Romero, (1992).
 Epidendrum caveroi D.E.Benn. & Christenson, (1998).
 Epidendrum cereiflorum Garay & Dunst., (1965).
 Epidendrum cerinum Schltr., (1918).
 Epidendrum cernuum Kunth in F.W.H.von Humboldt, A.J.A.Bonpland & C.S.Kunth, (1816).
 Epidendrum cesar-fernandezii Carnevali & I.Ramírez, (2003).
 Epidendrum chanchamayodifforme Hágsater & L.Sánchez, (1999).
 Epidendrum chaparense Dodson & R.Vásquez, (1989).
 Epidendrum chauvetii Hágsater & L.Sánchez, (1999).
 Epidendrum chimalapense Hágsater & Salazar, (1999).
 Epidendrum chimantense Hágsater & Carnevali, (1993).
 Epidendrum chioneoides Carnevali & G.A.Romero in G.A.Romero & G.Carnevali, (2000).
 Epidendrum chioneum Lindl., (1845).
 Epidendrum chirripoense Hágsater, (1993).
 Epidendrum chloe Rchb.f., (1856).
 Epidendrum chlorinum Barb.Rodr., (1881) : Greenish Epidendrum
 Epidendrum chlorops Rchb.f., (1880) :  Green Epidendrum
 Epidendrum chogoncolonchense Hágsater & Dodson, (1993).
 Epidendrum chortophyllum Schltr., (1921).
 Epidendrum chrysanthum Hágsater & Dodson, (2001).
 Epidendrum churunense Garay & Dunst., (1965).

 Epidendrum ciliare L., (1759) : Fringed Star Orchid
 Epidendrum cinnabarinum Salzm. ex Lindl., (1831) : Vermilion Epidendrum. Subgen. Amphiglottium, Sect. Schistochila, Subs. Carinata (Reichenbach, p. 389)
 Epidendrum circinatum Ames, (1924).
 Epidendrum cirrhochilum F.Lehm. & Kraenzl., (1899) : Tendriled-lip Epidendrum
 Epidendrum citrosmum Hágsater, (1988) : Lemon-scented Epidendrum
 Epidendrum cleistogastrium Hágsater & Dodson, (2001).
 Epidendrum clowesii Bateman ex Lindl., (1844) : Clowe's Epidendrum
 Epidendrum cnemidophorum Lindl., (1853) : Pfavi's Epidendrum
 Epidendrum cochabambanum Dodson & R.Vásquez, (1989).
 Epidendrum cochlidium Lindl., (1840).  Subgen. Amphiglottium, Sect. Schistochila, Subs. Tuberculata (Reichenbach, p. 393)
 Epidendrum cocleense Ames, F.T.Hubb. & C.Schweinf., (1936).
 Epidendrum cocoense Hágsater, (1999).
 Epidendrum cocornocturnum Hágsater, (1999).
 Epidendrum cogniauxianum Hoehne, (1949) : Cogniaux's Epidendrum
 Epidendrum colombianum A.D.Hawkes,: (1957).
 Epidendrum commelinispathum Carnevali & I.Ramírez in G.A.Romero & G.Carnevali, (2000).
 Epidendrum commelinoides Schltr., (1920).
 Epidendrum compressibulbum D.E.Benn. & Christenson, (1998) : Compressed Pseudobulb Epidendrum
 Epidendrum compressum Griseb., (1864) : Compressed Epidendrum
 Epidendrum confertum Ames & C.Schweinf., (1930).
 Epidendrum convergens Garay & Dunst., (1965).
 Epidendrum cooperianum Bateman, (1867) : Cooper's Epidendrum, Long-sheathed Epidendrum
 Epidendrum coordinatum Rchb.f., (1876).
 Epidendrum cordatum Ruiz & Pav. (1798).
 Epidendrum cordiforme C.Schweinf., (1940).
 Epidendrum coriifolium Lindl.,(1851) : Leather-like Leaf Epidendrum.  Subgenus Euepidendrum Lindl. Section Planifolia Rchb.f. Subsection Spathacea Rchb.f. (Reichenbach, p. 400)
 Epidendrum cornanthera F.Lehm. & Kraenzl., (1899).
 Epidendrum cornicallosum Foldats, (1969).
 Epidendrum cornutum Lindl., (1841).
 Epidendrum coronatum Ruiz & Pav., (1798).
 Epidendrum coryophorum (Kunth) Rchb.f., (1862).
 Epidendrum costanense Hágsater & Carnevali, (1993).
 Epidendrum costatum A.Rich. & Galeotti, (1845) : Ribbed-lip Epidendrum
 Epidendrum cottoniiflorum (Rchb.f.) Hágsater in R.Escobar (ed.), (1991).
 Epidendrum coxianum Rchb.f., (1877).
 Epidendrum crassinervium Kraenzl., (1905).
 Epidendrum crassum C.Schweinf., (1952).
 Epidendrum cremersii Hágsater & L.Sánchez, (1999).
 Epidendrum crenulidifforme L.Sánchez & Hágsater, (2001).
 Epidendrum criniferum Rchb.f., (1871) : Bract-carrying Epidendrum

 Epidendrum cristatum Ruiz & Pav., (1798) : Crested Epidendrum
 Epidendrum croatii Hágsater, (1999).
 Epidendrum croceum Ruiz & Pav., (1798).
 Epidendrum cryptanthum L.O.Williams, (1942).
 Epidendrum cryptoglossum Pabst, (1976).
 Epidendrum cuatrecasasii Garay, (1956).
 Epidendrum cuchibambae F.Lehm. & Kraenzl., (1899).
 Epidendrum cuencanum Schltr., (1921).
 Epidendrum cuneatum Schltr., (1912).
 Epidendrum cuniculatum Schltr., (1921).
 Epidendrum cupreum F.Lehm. & Kraenzl., (1899).
 Epidendrum curtisii A.D.Hawkes, (1957).
 Epidendrum curvicolumna Ames, F.T.Hubb. & C.Schweinf., (1935).
 Epidendrum curvisepalum Hágsater & Dressler, (1993).
 Epidendrum cusii Hágsater, (1978).
 Epidendrum cuyujense Hágsater & Dodson, (2001).
 Epidendrum cyclopterum Schltr., (1920).
 Epidendrum cylindraceum Lindl., (1844).
 Epidendrum cylindrostachys Rchb.f. & Warsz., (1854) : Cylindric-inflorescence Epidendrum
 Epidendrum cylindrostenophyllum Hágsater & Dodson, (2001).
 Epidendrum cymbiglossum Hágsater, (1993).
 Epidendrum cystosum Ames, (1934).

D 

 Epidendrum dactyloclinium Hágsater & Dodson, (2001).
 Epidendrum dalessandroi Hágsater & Dodson, (2001).
 Epidendrum dalstromii Dodson, (1984) : Dalstrom's Epidendrum
 Epidendrum davidsei Hágsater, (1993).
 Epidendrum decurviflorum Schltr., (1920).
 Epidendrum delcastilloi D.E.Benn. & Christenson, (1998).
 Epidendrum delicatissimum Rchb.f., (1876).
 Epidendrum deltoglossum Garay & Dunst., (1966).
 Epidendrum dendrobii Rchb.f., (1850).
 Epidendrum dendrobioides Thunb., (1818).
 Epidendrum densiflorum Hook., (1840).
 Epidendrum densifolium Kraenzl., (1905).

 Epidendrum denticulatum Barb.Rodr., (1881) : Toothed Epidendrum
 Epidendrum dentilobum Ames, F.T.Hubb. & C.Schweinf., (1935).
 Epidendrum dermatanthum Kraenzl., (1905).
 Epidendrum dialychilum Hágsater & Dodson, (1993).
 Epidendrum dialyrhombicum Hágsater & Dodson, (2001).
 Epidendrum dichaeoides Carnevali & G.A.Romero, (1992).
 Epidendrum dichotomum C.Presl, (1827). Subgen. Amphiglottium, Sect. Schistochila, Subs. Tuberculata (Reichenbach, p. 392)
 Epidendrum difforme Jacq., (1760) : Different Epidendrum
 Epidendrum diffusum Sw., (1788).
 Epidendrum dilochioides L.O.Williams, (1940).
 Epidendrum diothonaeoides Schltr., (1916) : Diothona-like Epidendrum
 Epidendrum diphyllum Schltr., (1920).
 Epidendrum dipus Lindl., (1845).
 Epidendrum discoidale Lindl., (1853).
 Epidendrum dixiorum Hágsater, (1993) : Dix's Epidendrum
 Epidendrum dodii L.Sánchez & Hágsater, (2001).
 Epidendrum × doroteae P.H.Allen, (1958).
 Epidendrum dorsocarinatum Hágsater, (1984).
 Epidendrum dosbocasense Hágsater, (1992).
 Epidendrum dressleri Hágsater, (1987).
 Epidendrum duckei Porto & Brade, (1938 publ. 1940).
 Epidendrum dugandianum A.D.Hawkes, (1957).
 Epidendrum dunstervillei A.D.Hawkes, (1957).
 Epidendrum dunstervilleorum Foldats, (1967).
 Epidendrum dwyeri Hágsater, (1993).

E 

 Epidendrum eburneum Rchb.f., (1867) : Ivory-colored Epidendrum, White Heart-shaped Lip Epidendrum
 Epidendrum echinatum Løjtnant, (1977).
 Epidendrum edwardsii Ames, (1932).
 Epidendrum elatum C.Schweinf., (1943).
 Epidendrum elcimeyae Hágsater & García-Cruz, (1999).
 Epidendrum elegantissimum F.Lehm. & Kraenzl., (1899).
 Epidendrum elleanthoides Schltr., (1920).
 Epidendrum ellemanniae Hágsater & Dodson, (2001).
 Epidendrum ellipsophyllum L.O.Williams, (1941).
 Epidendrum ellipticum Graham in W.J.Hooker, (1826). Subgen. Amphiglottium, Sect. Schistochila, Subs. Tuberculata (Reichenbach, p. 395)
 Epidendrum ellisii Rolfe, (1894).
 Epidendrum emarginatum Ruiz & Pav., (1798).
 Epidendrum embreei Dodson, (1982) : Embre's Epidendrum
 Epidendrum englerianum F.Lehm. & Kraenzl., (1899).
 Epidendrum envigadoense Hágsater, (1999).
 Epidendrum erectifolium Hágsater & L.Sánchez, (1993).
 Epidendrum eriksenii Hágsater & Dodson, (1993).
 Epidendrum erosum Ames & C.Schweinf., (1925).
 Epidendrum erythrostigma Hágsater, (1999).
 Epidendrum escobarianum Garay, (1967) : Escobar's Epidendrum
 Epidendrum espiritu-santense Dodson & R.Vásquez, (1989).
 Epidendrum estrellense Ames, (1923).
 Epidendrum euchroma Schltr., (1924).
 Epidendrum eugenii Schltr., (1920).
 Epidendrum eustirum Ames, F.T.Hubb. & C.Schweinf., (1935).
 Epidendrum evelynae Rchb.f., (1878).
 Epidendrum exaltatum Kraenzl., (1916).
 Epidendrum examinis S.Rosillo, (1984).
 Epidendrum excelsum C.Schweinf., (1970).
 Epidendrum excisum Lindl., (1844).
 Epidendrum exiguum Ames & C.Schweinf., (1930).
 Epidendrum exile Ames, (1923).
 Epidendrum eximium L.O.Williams, (1941) : Outstanding Epidendrum

F 

 Epidendrum falcatum Lindl., (1840).
 Epidendrum falcisepalum F.Lehm. & Kraenzl., (1899).
 Epidendrum farallonense Hágsater, (1999).
 Epidendrum farinosum R.Vásquez & Dodson, (1999).
 Epidendrum ferrugineum Ruiz & Pav., (1798) : Rust-red Epidendrum
 Epidendrum festucoides Kraenzl., (1920).
 Epidendrum filamentosum Kraenzl., (1920).
 Epidendrum filicaule Lindl., (1831).
 Epidendrum fimbriatum Kunth in HBK, (1816) : Fringed Epidendrum
 Epidendrum firmum Rchb.f., (1866).
 Epidendrum flexicaule Schltr., (1918).
 Epidendrum flexuosissimum C.Schweinf., (1949).
 Epidendrum flexuosum G.Mey., (1818) : Flexible Epidendrum. Subgen. Amphiglottium, Sect. Schistochila, Subs. Carinata (Reichenbach, p. 391)
 Epidendrum floridense Hágsater, (1993).
 Epidendrum foldatsii Hágsater & Carnevali, (1993).
 Epidendrum forcipatoides Hágsater, (2001).
 Epidendrum forcipatum C.Schweinf., (1970).
 Epidendrum fosbergii Hágsater & Dodson, (2001).
 Epidendrum frechetteanum D.E.Benn. & Christenson, (2001).
 Epidendrum friderici-guilielmi Rchb.f. & Warsz., (1854).
 Epidendrum frigidum Linden ex Lindl., (1845).
 Epidendrum fritzianum Hoehne, (1952).
 Epidendrum frutex Rchb.f., (1855).
 Epidendrum fruticetorum Schltr., (1921).
 Epidendrum fruticosum Pav. ex Lindl., (1831).
 Epidendrum fruticulum Schltr., (1921).
 Epidendrum fuscinum (Dressler) Hágsater (2005) (formerly Oerstedella fuscina)
 Epidendrum fujimorianum D.E.Benn. & Christenson, (1998).
 Epidendrum fulgens Brongn. in L.I.Duperrey, (1834) :  Glowing Upon a Tree. Subgen. Amphiglottium, Sect. Schistochila, Subs. Carinata (Reichenbach, p. 390)
 Epidendrum fusiforme (Lindl.) Rchb.f., (1862).

G 

 Epidendrum garayi Løjtnant, (1977).
 Epidendrum garcia-esquivelii Hágsater & L.Sánchez, (1993).
 Epidendrum garciae Pabst, (1976) : Garcia's Epidendrum
 Epidendrum gasteriferum Scheeren, (1974) : Pot-bellied Epidendrum
 Epidendrum gastrochilum Kraenzl., (1906).
 Epidendrum gastropodium Rchb.f., (1862) : Snail Epidendrum
 Epidendrum geminatum Schltr., (1921).
 Epidendrum geminiflorum Kunth in F.W.H.von Humboldt, A.J.A.Bonpland & C.S.Kunth, (1816).
 Epidendrum geniculatum Barb.Rodr., (1881).
 Epidendrum gentryi Dodson, (1982).
 Epidendrum gibbosum L.O.Williams, (1941).
 Epidendrum globiflorum F.Lehm. & Kraenzl., (1899).
 Epidendrum glossaspis Rchb.f., (1876).
 Epidendrum glossoceras Rchb.f. & Warsz., (1854).
 Epidendrum glumarum Hamer & Garay, (1985).
 Epidendrum goebelii Schltr., (1915).
 Epidendrum golondrinense Hágsater & Dodson, (2001).
 Epidendrum gomezii Schltr., (1918).
 Epidendrum goniorhachis Schltr., (1918).
 Epidendrum goodspeedianum A.D.Hawkes, (1957).
 Epidendrum gracilibracteatum Hágsater & Dodson, (2001).
 Epidendrum gracillimum Rchb.f. & Warsz., (1854).
 Epidendrum grand-ansense Nir, (2000).
 Epidendrum × gransabanense Carnevali & I.Ramírez, (2003).
 Epidendrum gratissimum (Rchb.f.) Hágsater & Dodson, (1992).
 Epidendrum grayi Hágsater & Dodson, (1993).
 Epidendrum greenwoodii Hágsater, (1987).
 Epidendrum gregorii Hágsater, (1993).
 Epidendrum guacamayense Hágsater & Dodson, (1993).
 Epidendrum guagra-urcuense Hágsater & Dodson, (2001).
 Epidendrum gualaquicense Hágsater & Dodson, (2001).
 Epidendrum guanacasense Hágsater & Dodson, (1993).
 Epidendrum guanacastense Ames & C.Schweinf., (1930).
 Epidendrum guerrerense Hágsater & García-Cruz, (1993) : Guerrero Epidendrum

H 

 Epidendrum haematanthum Schltr., (1921) : Blood-flower Epidendrum
 Epidendrum haenkeanum C.Presl, (1827).
 Epidendrum hagsateri Christenson, (1995).
 Epidendrum hajekii R.Vásquez & Dodson, (1999).
 Epidendrum hamatum (Garay) Dressler, (1971).
 Epidendrum hameri Hágsater & L.Sánchez, (1993).
 Epidendrum hammelii Hágsater & L.Sánchez, (1993).
 Epidendrum harlingii Hágsater & Dodson, (2001).
 Epidendrum harmsianum Kraenzl., (1916).
 Epidendrum harrisoniae Hook., (1833).
 Epidendrum hassleri Cogn., (1909).
 Epidendrum hastilabium Schltr., (1920).
 Epidendrum hellerianum A.D.Hawkes, (1966).
 Epidendrum hemiscleria Rchb.f., (1862).
 Epidendrum hemiscleria Rchb.f. subsp. occidentalis Christenson  (2005)
 Epidendrum hemisclerioides (Kraenzl.) Hágsater & Dodson, (1992).
 Epidendrum henignum Ames, (1923).
 Epidendrum henschenii Barb.Rodr., (1881).
 Epidendrum heringeri Hágsater, (2001).
 Epidendrum herrenhusanum Hágsater, (1999).
 Epidendrum heterodoxum Rchb.f., (1854).
 Epidendrum heterothoneum (Rchb.f. & Warsz.) Hágsater & Dodson, (1992).
 Epidendrum hexagonum Hágsater & Dodson, (1993).
 Epidendrum holmnielsenii Hágsater & Dodson, (2001).
 Epidendrum hololeucum Barb.Rodr., (1881).
 Epidendrum hombersleyi Summerh., (1934).
 Epidendrum homoion Hágsater & Dodson, (1993).
 Epidendrum hookerianum Rchb.f., (1876).
 Epidendrum hopfianum Schltr., (1924).
 Epidendrum horichii Hágsater, (1999).
 Epidendrum hueycantenangense Hágsater & García-Cruz, (1993).
 Epidendrum humeadorense Hágsater & Dodson, (1999).
 Epidendrum humidicola Schltr., (1922).
 Epidendrum hunterianum Schltr., (1922).
 Epidendrum hutchisonii Hágsater, (1999).
 Epidendrum hymenodes Lindl., (1853).

I 

 Epidendrum ibaguense Kunth in HBK, (1816) :  Ybague' Epidendrum. Subgen. Amphiglottium, Sect. Schistochila, Subs. Tuberculata (Reichenbach, p. 396)
 Epidendrum ibarrae R.González, (1993).
 Epidendrum iguagoi Hágsater & Dodson, (2001).

 Epidendrum ilense Dodson, (1977) : Ila Epidendrum
 Epidendrum ilinizae Hágsater & Dodson, (1999).
 Epidendrum iltisorum Dodson, (1980).
 Epidendrum imitans Schltr., (1921).
 Epidendrum imthurnii Ridl., (1886).
 Epidendrum inamoenum Kraenzl., (1906).
 Epidendrum incomptoides Ames, F.T.Hubb. & C.Schweinf., (1935).
 Epidendrum incomptum Rchb.f., (1853).
 Epidendrum indanzense Hágsater &; Dodson, (1993).
 Epidendrum indecoratum Schltr., (1921).
 Epidendrum infaustum Rchb.f., (1863).
 Epidendrum ingramii Hágsater & García-Cruz, (1999).
 Epidendrum inornatum Schltr., (1917).
 Epidendrum insectiferum Lindl., (1853).
 Epidendrum insignificans Hágsater & Dodson, (1993).
 Epidendrum insolatum Barringer, (1991 publ. 1992).
 Epidendrum insulanum Schltr., (1918).
 Epidendrum intertextum F.Lehm. & Kraenzl., (1899).
 Epidendrum ionodesme Schltr., (1920).
 Epidendrum ionophyllum P.Ortiz, (1997).
 Epidendrum isomerum Schltr., (1906).
 Epidendrum isthmi Schltr., (1922).

J 

 Epidendrum jajense Rchb.f., (1854) : Jaja Epidendrum
 Epidendrum jamaicense Lindl., (1853) :  Umbrella Star Orchid, Jamaican Epidendrum
 Epidendrum jamiesonis Rchb.f., (1856) : Jamieson's Epidendrum
 Epidendrum janeirense Porto & Brade, (1938 publ. 1940) : Rio de Janeiro Epidendrum
 Epidendrum jarae D.E.Benn. & Christenson, (2001).
 Epidendrum jaramilloae Hágsater & Dodson, (1993).
 Epidendrum jasminosmum Hágsater & Dodson, (2001).
 Epidendrum jativae Dodson, (1980).
 Epidendrum jatunsachanum Dodson & Hágsater, (1994).
 Epidendrum jefeallenii Hágsater & García-Cruz, (1999).
 Epidendrum jefestigma Hágsater & García-Cruz, (1999).
 Epidendrum jejunum Rchb.f., (1878).
 Epidendrum jessupiorum Hágsater & Dodson, (2001).
 Epidendrum jimburense Hágsater & Dodson, (2001).
 Epidendrum jimenezii Hágsater, (1999).
 Epidendrum johnstonii Ames, (1905) : Johnston's Epidendrum
 Epidendrum juergensenii Rchb.f., (1880).
 Epidendrum juruaense Cogn. in C.F.P.von Martius & auct. suc. (eds.), (1906).

K 

 Epidendrum kalloneuron Kraenzl., (1920).
 Epidendrum kanehirae Hágsater, (2001).
 Epidendrum kantenii Rchb.f., (1876).
Epidendrum katarun-yariku Hágsater & Wrazidlo, (2021)
 Epidendrum kautskyi Pabst, (1973).
 Epidendrum kerichilum Hágsater, (1888).
 Epidendrum kerryae Hágsater & L.Sánchez, (1994).
 Epidendrum killipii Hágsater & L.Sánchez, (1999).
 Epidendrum klotzscheanum Rchb.f., (1850).
 Epidendrum kockii Hágsater & Dodson, (1999).

L 
 
 Epidendrum laceratum C.Schweinf., (1952).
 Epidendrum lacertinum Lindl., (1841).
 Epidendrum lacustre Lindl., (1853) : Lakeside Epidendrum
 Epidendrum lagenocolumna Hágsater & L.Sánchez, (1993).
 Epidendrum lagenomorphum Hágsater & Dodson, (2001).
 Epidendrum lagotis Rchb.f., (1855).
 Epidendrum lamprochilum Hágsater, (1999).
 Epidendrum lanceolatum Bradford ex Griseb., (1864).
 Epidendrum lancilabium Schltr., (1923).
 Epidendrum lanioides Schltr., (1913).
 Epidendrum lanipes Lindl., (1853).
 Epidendrum lankesteri Ames, (1923).
 Epidendrum larae Dodson & R.Vásquez, (1989).
 Epidendrum laterale Rolfe, (1912) : Mrs. Rousseau's Epidendrum
 Epidendrum latibracteum Kraenzl., (1920).
 Epidendrum latilabre Lindl., (1841) : Broad-lipped Epidendrum
 Epidendrum latisegmentum C.Schweinf., (1943).
 Epidendrum laucheanum Bonhof ex Rolfe, (1893) : Lauche's Epidendrum
 Epidendrum laurelense Hágsater & Dodson, (2001).
 Epidendrum lawessonii Hágsater & Dodson, (2001).
 Epidendrum laxicaule D.E.Benn. & Christenson, (1998).
 Epidendrum laxifoliatum Schltr., (1920).
 Epidendrum lechleri Rchb.f., (1876).
 Epidendrum lehmannii Rchb.f., (1878).
 Epidendrum leimebambense Hágsater, (1993).
 Epidendrum leonii D.E.Benn. & Christenson, (1998).
 Epidendrum lezlieae R.Vásquez & Ibisch, (2003).
 Epidendrum lignosum Lex. in P.de La Llave & J.M.de Lexarza, (1825).
 Epidendrum liguliferum C.Schweinf., (1943).
 Epidendrum lilijae Foldats, (1968).
 Epidendrum lima Lindl., (1853).
 Epidendrum lindae Hágsater & Dodson, (1999).
 Epidendrum lindbergii Rchb.f., (1881).
 Epidendrum linearidiforme Hágsater & L.Sánchez, (1999).
 Epidendrum litense Hágsater & Dodson, (1993).
 Epidendrum littorale Hágsater & Dodson, (1993).
 Epidendrum llactapataense D.E.Benn. & Christenson,  (2001).
 Epidendrum llaviucoense Hágsater & Dodson, (2001).
 Epidendrum lloense (Lindl.) Hágsater & Dodson, (1992).
 Epidendrum lockhartioides Schltr., (1923).
 Epidendrum loefgrenii Cogn. in C.F.P.von Martius & auct. suc. (eds.), (1898).
 Epidendrum loejtnantii Hágsater & Dodson, (2001).
 Epidendrum longibracteatum Hágsater, (1999).
 Epidendrum longicaule (L.O.Williams) L.O.Williams, (1964) : Long-Stemmed Epidendrum
 Epidendrum longicolle Lindl., (1838).
 Epidendrum longicrure Schltr., (1920).
 Epidendrum longiflorum Kunth in F.W.H.von Humboldt, A.J.A.Bonpland & C.S.Kunth, (1816) : Long-flowered Epidendrum
 Epidendrum longipetalum A.Rich. & Galeotti, (1845) : Long-petaled Epidendrum
 Epidendrum longirepens (C.Schweinf.) C.Schweinf., (1953) : Far-crawling Epidendrum
 Epidendrum lopezii Hágsater, (1999).
 Epidendrum lowilliamsii García-Cruz, (1992) : Lowilliams' Epidendrum
 Epidendrum loxense F.Lehm. & Kraenzl., (1899).
 Epidendrum luckei I.Bock, (1984).
 Epidendrum lueri Dodson & Hágsater, (1989).
 Epidendrum lumbaquiense Hágsater & Dodson, (1999).

M 

 Epidendrum macasense Hágsater & Dodson, (1993).
 Epidendrum macbridei C.Schweinf., (1943) : Mc Brides' Epidendrum
 Epidendrum macdougallii (Hágsater) Hágsater  (2005) (formerly Oerstedella macdougallii)
 Epidendrum macrocarpum Rich., (1792) : Schomburgk's Epidendrum
 Epidendrum macroceras Schltr., (1920).
 Epidendrum macroclinium Hágsater, (1987) : Large Kliniandrum Epidendrum
 Epidendrum macrocyphum Kraenzl., (1905).
 Epidendrum macrogastrium Kraenzl., (1905).
 Epidendrum macroophorum Hágsater & Dodson, (1999).
 Epidendrum macropodum Rchb.f., (1856).
 Epidendrum macrothyrsoides Rchb.f., (1877).
 Epidendrum macrum Dressler, (1967).
 Epidendrum maderoi Schltr., (1920).
 Epidendrum madsenii Hágsater & Dodson, (1999).
 Epidendrum maduroi Hágsater & García-Cruz, (1999).
 Epidendrum magalhaesii Schltr., (1920).
 Epidendrum magdalenense Porto & Brade, (1935) : Magdalena Epidendrum
 Epidendrum magnibracteatum Ames, (1922).
 Epidendrum magnibracteum Kraenzl., (1920).
 Epidendrum magnificum Schltr., (1918) : Magnificent Epidendrum
 Epidendrum magnoliae Muhl., (1813).
 Epidendrum maldonadoense Hágsater & Dodson, (2001).
 Epidendrum manarae Foldats, (1968).
 Epidendrum mancum Lindl., (1844).
 Epidendrum mantinianum Rolfe, (1892).
 Epidendrum mantiqueranum Porto & Brade, (1938 publ. 1940).
 Epidendrum mantis-religiosae Hágsater, (1988).
 Epidendrum marmoratum A.Rich. & Galeotti, (1845) : Marbled Epidendrum
 Epidendrum marsiorum R.Vásquez & Ibisch, (2003).
 Epidendrum marsupiale F.Lehm. & Kraenzl., (1899).
 Epidendrum martianum Lindl., (1840).
 Epidendrum martinezii L.Sánchez & Carnevali, (2001).
 Epidendrum mathewsii Rchb.f., (1886).
 Epidendrum matudae L.O.Williams, (1968).

 Epidendrum medusae (Rchb.f.) Pfitzer in H.G.A.Engler & K.A.E.Prantl (eds.),. (1889).
 Epidendrum megagastrium Lindl., (1853) : Large-bulging Belly Epidendrum
 Epidendrum megaloclinium Hágsater & Dodson, (2001).
 Epidendrum megalospathum Rchb.f., (1877).
 Epidendrum melanoporphyreum Hágsater, (1993) : Black-purple Epidendrum
 Epidendrum melanotrichoides Hágsater & Dodson, (1999).
 Epidendrum melanoxeros Hágsater & Dodson, (1999).
 Epidendrum melinanthum Schltr., (1920).
 Epidendrum melistagum Hágsater, (1988).
 Epidendrum mesocarpum Hágsater, (1999).
 Epidendrum mesomicron Lindl., (1853).
 Epidendrum microcardium Schltr., (1923).
 Epidendrum microcarpum Hágsater & Dodson, (2001).
 Epidendrum microcattleya (Kraenzl.) Schltr., (1921).
 Epidendrum microcattleyioides D.E.Benn. & Christenson, (2001).
 Epidendrum microcephalum Hágsater & L.Sánchez, (1999).
 Epidendrum microcharis Rchb.f., (1870).
 Epidendrum microdendron Rchb.f., (1866).
 Epidendrum microdiothoneum Hágsater & Dodson, (2001).
 Epidendrum microglossum Schltr., (1917).
 Epidendrum micronocturnum Carnevali & G.A.Romero, (1996).
 Epidendrum microphyllum Lindl., (1841).
 Epidendrum miguelii Schltr., (1925).
 Epidendrum milenae Dodson & R.Vásquez, (1989).
 Epidendrum millei Schltr., (1917).
 Epidendrum mimeticum Carnevali & G.A.Romero in G.A.Romero & G.Carnevali, (2000).
 Epidendrum minarum Hoehne & Schltr., (1921).
 Epidendrum miniatum Schltr., (1921).
 Epidendrum mininocturnum Dodson, (1977).
 Epidendrum minus (Cogn.) Hágsater, (1999).
 Epidendrum minutidentatum C.Schweinf., (1943).
 Epidendrum minutiflorum C.Schweinf., (1943).
 Epidendrum mirabile Ames & C.Schweinf., (1930) : Wonderful Epidendrum
 Epidendrum miradoranum Dodson & D.E.Benn., (1989).
 Epidendrum misasii Hágsater (2005) (formerly Oerstedella viridiflora Hágsater)
 Epidendrum miserrimum Rchb.f., (1855) : Woodland Tufted Orchid
 Epidendrum miserum Lindl., (1841) : Insignificant Epidendrum
 Epidendrum mittelstaedtii Hágsater, (1993).
 Epidendrum mixtecanum Hágsater & García-Cruz, (1993).
 Epidendrum mixtoides Hágsater & Dodson, (1993).
 Epidendrum mixtum Schltr., (1912).
 Epidendrum mocinoi Hágsater, (1999).
 Epidendrum modestissimum F.Lehm. & Kraenzl., (1899).
 Epidendrum modestum Rchb.f. & Warsz., (1854).
 Epidendrum mojandae Schltr., (1921).
 Epidendrum molaui Hágsater & Dodson, (2001).
 Epidendrum molle Rchb.f., (1876).
 Epidendrum monanthum Schltr., (1916).
 Epidendrum monophlebium Hágsater, (1999).
 Epidendrum × monteverdense (Pupulin & Hágsater) Hágsater (2005) (formerly Oerstedella × monteverdensis)
 Epidendrum montis-narae Pupulin & L.Sánchez, (2001).
 Epidendrum montispichinchense Hágsater & Dodson, (2001).
 Epidendrum montserratense Nir, (2000).
 Epidendrum monzonense Kraenzl., (1905).
 Epidendrum mora-retanae Hágsater, (1993).
 Epidendrum morganii Dodson & Garay, (1980).
 Epidendrum moritzii Rchb.f., (1850).

 Epidendrum moronense Dodson & Hágsater, (1989).
 Epidendrum morrisii Hágsater & L.Cerv., (2001).
 Epidendrum muricatisepalum Hágsater 2004
 Epidendrum muricatoides Hágsater & Dodson, (1993).
 Epidendrum muscicola Schltr., (1923).
 Epidendrum musciferum Lindl., (1834).
 Epidendrum mutelianum Cogn. in I.Urban, (1910).
 Epidendrum mutisii Hágsater, (1999).
 Epidendrum myodes Rchb.f., (1866).
 Epidendrum myrmecophorum Barb.Rodr., (1891).

N 

 Epidendrum nanegalense Hágsater & Dodson, (2001).
 Epidendrum nanopsis Dodson & Hágsater, (1989).
 Epidendrum nanosimplex Hágsater & Dodson, (1999).
 Epidendrum nanum C.Schweinf., (1943).
 Epidendrum neglectum Schltr., (1921).
 Epidendrum nelsonii Hágsater, (1987).
 Epidendrum nematopetalum Hágsater & Dodson, (2001).
 Epidendrum neogaliciensis Hágsater & R.González, (1983).
 Epidendrum neolehmannia Schltr., (1921).
 Epidendrum neoporpax Ames, (1934).
 Epidendrum neoviridiflorum Hágsater, (1992).
 Epidendrum neudeckeri Dodson & Hágsater, (1994).
 Epidendrum nicaraguense Scheeren ex Hágsater, (1993).
 Epidendrum nigricans Schltr., (1913).
 Epidendrum nitens Rchb.f., (1866) : Bright Epidendrum
 Epidendrum nitidum L.O.Williams, (1940).
 Epidendrum noackii Cogn. in C.F.P.von Martius & auct. suc. (eds.), (1906).

 Epidendrum nocturnum Jacq., (1760). (type species) : Night-scented Orchid
 Epidendrum norae Carnevali & G.A.Romero, (1996).
 Epidendrum notabile Schltr., (1923).
 Epidendrum nubigena Schltr., (1924).
 Epidendrum nubium Rchb.f., (1866).
 Epidendrum nuriense Carnevali & Hágsater, (1992).
 Epidendrum nutans Sw., (1788) : Nodding Epidendrum
 Epidendrum nutantirhachis Ames & C.Schweinf., (1930).

O 
 
 Epidendrum oaxacanum Rolfe, (1904).
 Epidendrum obergii A.D.Hawkes, (1957).
 Epidendrum obliquifolium Ames, F.T.Hubb. & C.Schweinf., (1935).
 Epidendrum obliquum Schltr., (1912).
 Epidendrum oblongialpicola Hágsater & Dodson, (2001).
 Epidendrum obovatipetalum Hágsater & Dodson, (1993).
 Epidendrum ochricolor A.D.Hawkes, (1957).
 Epidendrum ochriodes Lindl., (1853).
 Epidendrum ochrochlorum Barb.Rodr., (1881).
 Epidendrum octomerioides Schltr., (1907).
 Epidendrum odontochilum Hágsater, (1988).
 Epidendrum odontospathum Rchb.f., (1878).
 Epidendrum oellgaardii Hágsater & Dodson, (1993).
 Epidendrum oerstedii Rchb.f., (1852).
 Epidendrum oldemanii Christenson, (1994).
 Epidendrum oligophyllum F.Lehm. & Kraenzl., (1899).
 Epidendrum ophidion Dodson & R.Vásquez, (1989).
 Epidendrum opiranthizon Hágsater & Dodson, (1993).
 Epidendrum oraion Hágsater, (1993).
 Epidendrum orbiculatum C.Schweinf., (1943) : Rounded-lip Epidendrum
 Epidendrum orchidiflorum Salzm. ex Lindl., (1831).
 Epidendrum oreogena Schltr., (1924).
 Epidendrum oreonastes Rchb.f., (1878).
 Epidendrum orgyale Lindl., (1845).
 Epidendrum orientale Hágsater & M.A.Díaz, (1993).
 Epidendrum ornithidii Schltr., (1921).
 Epidendrum ornithoglossum Schltr., (1917).
 Epidendrum orthocaule Schltr., (1921).
 Epidendrum orthoclinium Hágsater & Dodson, (2001).
 Epidendrum orthodontum Hágsater & L.Sánchez, (1999).
 Epidendrum orthophyllum Hágsater & Dodson, (1993).
 Epidendrum oxapampense Hágsater, (1999).
 Epidendrum oxycalyx Hágsater & Dodson, (1993).
 Epidendrum oxyglossum Schltr., (1923).
 Epidendrum oxynanodes Hágsater, (1999).
 Epidendrum oyacachiense Hágsater, (1992).

P 
 
 Epidendrum pachoi Hágsater & L.Sánchez, (2001).
 Epidendrum pachyceras Hágsater & L.Sánchez, (1993).
 Epidendrum pachychilum Kraenzl., (1905).
 Epidendrum pachyneuron Schltr., (1920).
 Epidendrum pachyphyton Garay, (1973).
 Epidendrum pachyrachis Ames, (1923).
 Epidendrum palaciosii Hágsater & Dodson, (1993).
 Epidendrum pallatangae Schltr., (1917).
 Epidendrum pallens Rchb.f., (1866).
 Epidendrum pallidiflorum Hook., (1830) : Caribbean Star Orchid
 Epidendrum palmense Ames
 Epidendrum palmidium Hágsater, (1999).
 Epidendrum pampatamboense Dodson & R.Vásquez, (1989).
 Epidendrum panamense Schltr., (1913).
 Epidendrum panchrysum Rchb.f. & Warsz., (1854). Subgen. Amphiglottium, Sect. Schistochila, Subs. Tuberculata (Reichenbach, p. 397)
 Epidendrum panduratum Hágsater & Dodson, (1993).
 Epidendrum panicoides Schltr., (1921).

 Epidendrum paniculatum Ruiz & Pav., (1798) : Paniculate Epidendrum
 Epidendrum paniculosum Barb.Rodr., (1877).
 Epidendrum panteonense Dodson & R.Vásquez, (1989).
 Epidendrum papallactense Hágsater & Dodson, (2001).
 Epidendrum paradisicola Hágsater & García-Cruz, (1999).
 Epidendrum paraguastigma Hágsater & García-Cruz, (1999).
 Epidendrum parahybunense Barb.Rodr., (1881).
 Epidendrum paranaense Barb.Rodr., (1881). Subgenus Euepidendrum Lindl. Section Planifolia Rchb.f. Subsection Spathacea Rchb.f. (Reichenbach p. 401 as E. imbricatum Lindl. (1831) nom. illeg.)
 Epidendrum paranthicum Rchb.f., (1852).

 Epidendrum parkinsonianum Hook., (1840) : Dagger-shaped Epidendrum
 Epidendrum parkinsonianum var. falcatum (synonym of Epidendrum falcatum Lindl, 1840 )
 Epidendrum paruimense G.A.Romero & Carnevali  (2004)
 Epidendrum parviflorum Ruiz & Pav., (1798).
 Epidendrum parvilabre Lindl. in G.Bentham, (1845).
 Epidendrum parviexasperatum (Hágsater) Hágsater (2005) (formerly Oerstedella parviexasperata)
 Epidendrum pastoense Schltr., (1920).
 Epidendrum pastranae Hágsater, (1978).
 Epidendrum patens Sw., (1806) : West Indian Star Orchid
 Epidendrum paucifolium Schltr., (1907).
 Epidendrum pazii Hágsater, (2001).
 Epidendrum pedale Schltr., 0 (1926).
 Epidendrum pedicellare Schltr., Repert. Spec. Nov. Regni Veg. 14: 390 (1916).
 Epidendrum pendens L.O.Williams, (1941).
 Epidendrum penneystigma Hágsater & García-Cruz, (1999).
 Epidendrum pentacarinatum Hágsater & Dodson, (1999).
 Epidendrum peperomia Rchb.f., (1854) : Peperomia-like Epidendrum
 Epidendrum peperomioides Schltr., (1921).
 Epidendrum peraltum Schltr., (1920).
 Epidendrum pergameneum Rchb.f., (1866).
 Epidendrum pergracile Schltr., (1921).
 Epidendrum perijaense Carnevali & G.A.Romero in G.A.Romero & G.Carnevali, (2000).
 Epidendrum pernambucense Cogn. in C.F.P.von Martius & auct. suc. (eds.), (1906).
 Epidendrum persinnile Schltr., (1920).
 Epidendrum peruvianum A.D.Hawkes, (1957).
 Epidendrum philippii Rchb.f., (1850).
 Epidendrum philocremnum Hágsater & Dodson, (2001).
 Epidendrum phragmites A.H.Heller & L.O.Williams, (1968).
 Epidendrum phyllocharis Rchb.f., (1878).
 Epidendrum physodes Rchb.f., (1873).
 Epidendrum physophorum Schltr., (1913).
 Epidendrum physopus Kraenzl., (1905).
 Epidendrum pichinchae Schltr., (1921).
 Epidendrum pilcuense Hágsater, (1993).
 Epidendrum piliferum Rchb.f., (1876).
 Epidendrum piperinum Lindl., (1845).
 Epidendrum pirrense Hágsater, (2001).
 Epidendrum pittieri Ames, (1922).
 Epidendrum plagiophyllum Hágsater, (1999).
 Epidendrum platychilum Schltr., (1921).
 Epidendrum platyclinium Hágsater & Dodson, (1999).
 Epidendrum platyglossum Rchb.f., (1876).
 Epidendrum platyotis Rchb.f., (1859).
 Epidendrum platypetalum Hágsater, (2001).
 Epidendrum platyphylloserpens Hágsater, (2001).
 Epidendrum platyphyllostigma Hágsater & García-Cruz, (1999).
 Epidendrum platystigma Rchb.f., (1866).
 Epidendrum pleurobotrys Schltr., (1921).
 Epidendrum pleurothalloides Hágsater, (1993).
 Epidendrum podocarpophilum Schltr., (1921).
 Epidendrum podostylos Hágsater & Dodson, (1993).
 Epidendrum poeppigii Hágsater, (1993).
 Epidendrum pogonochilum Carnevali & G.A.Romero in G.A.Romero & G.Carnevali, (2000).
 Epidendrum pollardii Hágsater, (1993).
 Epidendrum polyanthogastrium Hágsater & Dodson, (1999).
 Epidendrum polyanthum Lindl., (1831) : Many-flowered Epidendrum
 Epidendrum polychlamys Schltr., (1906).
 Epidendrum polychromum Hágsater, (1979).
 Epidendrum polygonatum Lindl., (1858).
 Epidendrum polystachyoides Kraenzl., (1920).
 Epidendrum polystachyum Kunth in F.W.H.von Humboldt, A.J.A.Bonpland & C.S.Kunth, (1816).
 Epidendrum pomacochense Hágsater, (1999).
 Epidendrum pomecense Hágsater, (1999).
 Epidendrum popayanense F.Lehm. & Kraenzl., (1899).
 Epidendrum porphyreum Lindl., (1841) : Purple Epidendrum
 Epidendrum porquerense F.Lehm. & Kraenzl., (1899).
 Epidendrum posadarum Hágsater, (2001).
 Epidendrum powellii Schltr., (1922).
 Epidendrum pozoi Hágsater & Dodson, (1993).
 Epidendrum praetervisum Rchb.f., (1876).
 Epidendrum prasinum Schltr., (1920).
 Epidendrum presbyteri-ludgeronis Gomes Ferreira, (1994).
 Epidendrum pristes Rchb.f., (1886).
 Epidendrum probiflorum Schltr., (1922).
 Epidendrum proligerum Barb.Rodr., (1877) : Rich Fruit-bearing Epidendrum
 Epidendrum propinquum A.Rich. & Galeotti, (1845) : Closely Related Epidendrum
 Epidendrum prostratum (Lindl.) Cogn. in C.F.P.von Martius & auct. suc. (eds.), (1898).
 Epidendrum pseudapaganum D.E.Benn. & Christenson, (1998).
 Epidendrum pseudavicula Kraenzl., (1911).
 Epidendrum pseudepidendrum Rchb.f., 0 (1856) : False Epidendrum
 Epidendrum pseudoalbiflorum D.E.Benn. & Christenson, (1998).
 Epidendrum pseudoanceps D.E.Benn. & Christenson, (1998) : Almost-like Anceps Epidendrum
 Epidendrum pseudocernuum Carnevali & I.Ramírez, (1998).
 Epidendrum pseudodifforme Hoehne & Schltr., (1925).
 Epidendrum pseudogramineum D.E.Benn. & Christenson, (2001).
 Epidendrum pseudolankesteri Carnevali & G.A.Romero in G.A.Romero & G.Carnevali, (2000).
 Epidendrum pseudonocturnum Hágsater & Dodson, (1993).
 Epidendrum pseudopaniculatum Dodson, (1978).
 Epidendrum pseudopolystachyum D.E.Benn. & Christenson, (2001).
 Epidendrum pseudoramosum Schltr., (1912) : Grand Star Orchid
 Epidendrum pteroglottis Schltr., (1921).
 Epidendrum pterostele Hágsater & Dodson, (2001).
 Epidendrum puberulosum Hágsater, (1992).
 Epidendrum pubiflorum C.Schweinf.,(1943).
 Epidendrum pucunoense Hágsater & Dodson, (2001).
 Epidendrum pudicum Ames, (1923).
 Epidendrum pulchrum (Schltr.) Hágsater & Dodson, (1992).
 Epidendrum puniceoluteum F.Pinheiro & F.Barros (2006). E. subg. Amphiglottium, E. sect. Schistochila, E. subsect. Carinata
 Epidendrum purpurascens Focke, (1851).
 Epidendrum × purpureum Barb.Rodr., (1877).
 Epidendrum purum Lindl., (1844) : Single-colored Epidendrum
 Epidendrum puteum Standl. & L.O.Williams, (1953).
 Epidendrum putidocardiophyllum Hágsater & Dodson, (2001).
 Epidendrum putumayoense Hágsater & L.Sánchez, (1999).
 Epidendrum puyoense Hágsater & Dodson, (2001).

Q 

 Epidendrum quadrangulatum A.D.Hawkes, (1957).
 Epidendrum quinquecallosum Schltr., (1920).
 Epidendrum quinquepartitum Schltr., (1922).
 Epidendrum quisayanum Schltr., (1916) : Quisaya Epidendrum
 Epidendrum quitensium Rchb.f., (1862).  Subgen. Amphiglottium, Sect. Schistochila, Subs. Tuberculata (Reichenbach, p. 392)

R 

 Epidendrum radicans Pav. ex Lindl., (1831) : Rooting Epidendrum. Subgen. Amphiglottium, Sect. Schistochila, Subs. Carinata (Reichenbach, p. 390)
 Epidendrum radioferens (Ames, F.T.Hubb. & C.Schweinf.) Hágsater, (1977) : Rayed-lip Epidendrum
 Epidendrum rafael-lucasii Hágsater, (1993).
 Epidendrum ramonianum Schltr., (1923).
 Epidendrum ramosissimum Ames & C.Schweinf., (1925).
 Epidendrum ramosum Jacq., (1760) : Mountain Star Orchid. Subgenus Euepidendrum Lindl. Section Planifolia Rchb.f. Subsection Spathacea Rchb.f. (Reichenbach p. 399)
 Epidendrum raphidophorum Lindl., (1853).
 Epidendrum reclinatum Carnevali & I.Ramírez, (2003).
 Epidendrum rectopedunculatum C.Schweinf., (1943).
 Epidendrum recurvatum Lindl., (1845).
 Epidendrum refractum Lindl., (1843).
 Epidendrum renilabioides Hágsater & Dodson, (2001).
 Epidendrum renilabium Schltr., (1920).
 Epidendrum renzii Garay & Dunst., (1965).
 Epidendrum repens Cogn., (1909).
 Epidendrum resectum Rchb.f., (1876).
 Epidendrum reveloi Hágsater & Dodson, (1993).
 Epidendrum revertianum (Stehlé) Hágsater, (1993).
 Epidendrum revolutum Barb.Rodr., (1877).
 Epidendrum rhizomaniacum Rchb.f., (1878) : Rhizome Epidendrum
 Epidendrum rhodanthum Hágsater & Dodson, (1999).
 Epidendrum rhodoides Hágsater & Dodson, (2001).
 Epidendrum rhombochilum L.O.Williams, (1940).
 Epidendrum rhopalostele Hágsater & Dodson, (2001).
 Epidendrum rigidiflorum Schltr., (1923).
 Epidendrum rigidum Jacq., (1760) : Stiff Flower Star Orchid, Rigid Epidendrum.  Subgenus Epidendrum Lindl. Section Planifolia Rchb.f. Subsection Spathacea Rchb.f. (Reichenbach p. 400)
 Epidendrum riobambae Schltr., (1921).
 Epidendrum rivulare Lindl., (1858).
 Epidendrum robustum Cogn. in C.F.P.von Martius & auct. suc. (eds.), (1906).
 Epidendrum rocalderianum P.Ortiz & Hágsater, (1999).
 Epidendrum rodrigoi Hágsater, (1993).
 Epidendrum rojasii Cogn., (1912).
 Epidendrum rolfeanum F.Lehm. & Kraenzl., (1899).
 Epidendrum romanii Hágsater & Dodson, (1993).
 Epidendrum roncanum Dodson & R.Vásquez, (1989).
 Epidendrum rondoniense L.C.Menezes, (1990) : Rondonia Epidendrum
 Epidendrum rondosianum C.Schweinf., (1943).
 Epidendrum roseoscriptum Hágsater, (1993).
 Epidendrum rosilloi Hágsater, (1988).
 Epidendrum rostratum Garay & Dunst., (1961).
 Epidendrum rostrigerum Rchb.f., (1876).
 Epidendrum rothii A.D.Hawkes, (1957).
 Epidendrum rotundifolium Hágsater & Dodson, (2001).
 Epidendrum rowleyi Withner & Pollard, (1969).
 Epidendrum rubioi Hágsater & Dodson, (1993).
 Epidendrum rubroticum Hágsater, (1993).
 Epidendrum rueckerae Rchb.f., (1865).
 Epidendrum rugosum Ames, (1923).
 Epidendrum rugulosum Schltr., (1920).
 Epidendrum ruizianum Steud., (1840) : Ruiz's Epidendrum
 Epidendrum ruizlarreanum D.E.Benn. & Christenson, (2001).
 Epidendrum rupestre Lindl., (1841).
 Epidendrum rupicola Cogn. in C.F.P.von Martius & auct. suc. (eds.), (1898).

S 

 Epidendrum saccatum Hágsater, (2001).
 Epidendrum samaipatense Dodson & R.Vásquez, (1989).
 Epidendrum sanchoi Ames, (1923).
 Epidendrum sanctae-martae Schltr., (1920).
 Epidendrum sanctalucianum H.G.Jones, (1975).
 Epidendrum sancti-ramoni Kraenzl., (1929).
 Epidendrum sanderi A.D.Hawkes, (1957).
 Epidendrum santaclarense Ames, (1923).
 Epidendrum sarcochilum Lindl. & Rchb.f., (1854).
 Epidendrum sarcodes Lindl., Fol. Orchid. (1853).
 Epidendrum sarcoglottis Schltr., (1921).
 Epidendrum sarcostalix Rchb.f. & Warsz., (1854).
 Epidendrum saxatile Lindl., (1841) : Rock-living Epidendrum
 Epidendrum saxicola Kraenzl., (1905).
 Epidendrum saximontanum Pabst, (1967).
 Epidendrum scabrum Ruiz & Pav., (1798).
 Epidendrum scalpelligerum Rchb.f., (1865).
 Epidendrum scharfii Hágsater & Dodson, (1993).
 Epidendrum schistochilum Schltr., (1924).

 Epidendrum schizoclinandrium D.E.Benn. & Christenson, (2001).
 Epidendrum schlimii Rchb.f., (1850).  Subgen. Amphiglottium, Sect. Schistochila, Subs. Tuberculata (Reichenbach, p. 396)
 Epidendrum schneideri Hágsater, (2001).
 Epidendrum schnitteri Schltr., (1921).
 Epidendrum schunkei D.E.Benn. & Christenson, (1998).
 Epidendrum scopulorum Rchb.f., (1878).
 Epidendrum sculptum Rchb.f., (1854).
 Epidendrum scutella Lindl., (1844).
 Epidendrum secundum Jacq., (1760) :  Elongated Lip Epidendrum. Subgen. Amphiglottium, Sect. Schistochila, Subs. Tuberculata (Reichenbach, p. 395)
 Epidendrum selaginella Schltr., (1906).
 Epidendrum semiteretifolium D.E.Benn. & Christenson, (1995).
 Epidendrum septumspinae D.E.Benn. & Christenson, (2001).
 Epidendrum serpens Lindl. in G.Bentham, (1845) : Serpent Epidendrum
 Epidendrum sertorum Garay & Dunst., (1972).
 Epidendrum seytocladium Schltr., (1920).
 Epidendrum shigenobui Hágsater, (1999).
 Epidendrum sierrae-peladae Kraenzl.,(1920).
 Epidendrum sigmoideum Hágsater, (1999).
 Epidendrum silvae Hágsater & V.P.Castro, (1999).
 Epidendrum silvanum V.P.Castro & Chiron, (2003).
 Epidendrum silverstonei Hágsater, (1999).
 Epidendrum simulacrum Ames, (1923).
 Epidendrum singuliflorum Schltr., (1912).
 Epidendrum sinuosum Lindl., (1853).
 Epidendrum siphonosepaloides T.Hashim., (1986).
 Epidendrum siphonosepalum Garay & Dunst., (1972).
 Epidendrum sisgaense Hágsater, (2001).
 Epidendrum skutchii Ames, F.T.Hubb. & C.Schweinf., (1936).
 Epidendrum smaragdinum Lindl., (1838).
 Epidendrum sobralioides Ames & Correll, (1943) : Sobralia-Like Epidendrum
 Epidendrum socorrense Rchb.f. & Warsz., (1854).  Subgen. Amphiglottium, Sect. Schistochila, Subs. Tuberculata (Reichenbach, p. 396)
 Epidendrum sodiroi Schltr., (1916).
 Epidendrum sophronitis Lindl. & Rchb.f., (1857).
 Epidendrum sophronitoides F.Lehm. & Kraenzl., (1899) : Sophronitis-Like Epidendrum
 Epidendrum soratae Rchb.f., (1878).
 Epidendrum sotoanum Karremans & Hágsater (2010)
 Epidendrum spathulipetalum Hágsater & Dressler, (2001).
 Epidendrum sphaeranthum Schltr., (1921).
 Epidendrum sphaerostachyum Rchb.f., (1877).
 Epidendrum sphenoglossum F.Lehm. & Kraenzl., (1899).
 Epidendrum spicatum Hook.f., (1851). Subgen. Amphiglottium, Sect. Schistochila, Subs. Carinata (Reichenbach, p. 389)
 Epidendrum spilotum Garay & Dunst., (1976).
 Epidendrum spinescens Lindl., (1853).  Subgen. Amphiglottium, Sect. Schistochila, Subs. Tuberculata (Reichenbach, p. 392)
 Epidendrum spruceanum Lindl., (1853).
 Epidendrum stalkyi Carnevali & G.A.Romero in G.A.Romero & G.Carnevali, (2000).
 Epidendrum stallforthianum Kraenzl., (1912).
 Epidendrum stamfordianum Bateman, (1839) : Stamford's Epidendrum
 Epidendrum stangeanum Rchb.f., (1881).
 Epidendrum stanhopeanum Kraenzl., (1897).
 Epidendrum steinbachii Ames, (1922).
 Epidendrum stellidifforme Hágsater & Dodson, (2001).
 Epidendrum stenopetaloides Kraenzl., (1920).
 Epidendrum stenophyllum Hágsater & Dodson, (1993).
 Epidendrum stenophyton Schltr., (1921).
 Epidendrum sterroanthum Schltr., (1920).
 Epidendrum sterrophyllum Schltr., (1920).
 Epidendrum stevensii Hágsater, (1992).
 Epidendrum stevensonii Hágsater & Dodson, (2001).
 Epidendrum steyermarkii A.D.Hawkes, (1957).
 Epidendrum stiliferum Dressler, (1967).
 Epidendrum stolidium Hágsater (2005) (formerly Oerstedella ornata )
 Epidendrum storkii Ames, (1924) : Stork's Epidendrum
 Epidendrum stramineum Lindl., (1853).
 Epidendrum strictiforme C.Schweinf., (1949).
 Epidendrum strictum Schltr., (1924).
 Epidendrum strobiliferum Rchb.f., (1859) :  Pine Cone Epidendrum.  Subgenus Epidendrum Lindl. Section Planifolia Rchb.f. Subsection Spathacea Rchb.f. (Reichenbach, pp. 399–400)
 Epidendrum strobiloides Garay & Dunst., (1966).
 Epidendrum suaveolens Ames, (1922).
 Epidendrum suavis (Rchb.f. & Warsz.) Løjtnant, (1977) : Soft Epidendrum
 Epidendrum subadnatum Rchb.f., (1876).
 Epidendrum subfloribundum Schltr., (1924).
 Epidendrum sublobatum C.Schweinf. ex Garay & Dunst., (1965).
 Epidendrum subnutans Ames & C.Schweinf., (1930).
 Epidendrum suborbiculare Schltr., (1924).
 Epidendrum subpurum Rchb.f., (1854) : Hart's Epidendrum
 Epidendrum subreniforme C.Schweinf., (1943).
 Epidendrum subtorquatum Kraenzl., (1920).
 Epidendrum successivum Hágsater & F.E.L.Miranda, (1993).
 Epidendrum succulentum Hágsater, (1988).
 Epidendrum sucumbiense Hágsater & Dodson, (2001).
 Epidendrum suinii Hágsater & Dodson, (2001).
 Epidendrum sulcatum Ames, (1922).
 Epidendrum sumacoense Hágsater & Dodson, (1993).
 Epidendrum summerhayesii Hágsater, (1993).
 Epidendrum superpositum Garay, (1958).
 Epidendrum suturatum Hágsater & Dressler, (1993).
 Epidendrum sympetalostele Hágsater & L.Sánchez, (1993).
 Epidendrum sympodiale Schltr., (1920).
 Epidendrum synchronum Hágsater 2004
 Epidendrum syringodes Schltr., (1929).
 Epidendrum syringothyrsis Rchb.f. ex Hook.f., (1875).

T 

 Epidendrum tacarcunense Hágsater, (1999).
 Epidendrum tachirense Foldats, (1968).
 Epidendrum talamancanum (J.T.Atwood) Mora-Ret. & García Castro, (1990 publ. 1991).
 Epidendrum tamaense Foldats, (1968).
 Epidendrum tandapianum Dodson & Hágsater, (1989).
 Epidendrum tenax Rchb.f., (1854).
 Epidendrum tenue Lindl., (1841).
 Epidendrum tenuicaule F.Lehm. & Kraenzl., (1899).
 Epidendrum tenuispathum C.Schweinf., (1952).
 Epidendrum tessmannii Mansf., (1928).
 Epidendrum teuscherianum A.D.Hawkes, (1957).
 Epidendrum thelephorum Hágsater & Dodson, (1993).
 Epidendrum theodorii Schltr., (1922).
 Epidendrum thermophilum Hágsater & Dodson, (1993).
 Epidendrum thompsonii Hágsater & Dodson, Icon. Orchid. 3: t. 385 (1999).
 Epidendrum thurstoniorum Hágsater, (1999).
 Epidendrum tigriphyllum Hágsater, (1999).
 Epidendrum tingo-mariae Hágsater, (1999).
 Epidendrum tipuloideum Lindl., (1853).
 Epidendrum tolimense Lindl., (1845).
 Epidendrum tomlinsonianum C.D.Adams, (1966).
 Epidendrum tonduzii Lank., (1924).
 Epidendrum torquatum Lindl. in G.Bentham, (1845).
 Epidendrum torraense Hágsater & Silverst., (2001).
 Epidendrum tortipetalum Scheeren, (1976) : Twisted-petal Epidendrum
 Epidendrum tovarense Rchb.f., (1850).
 Epidendrum trachychlaena Schltr., (1917).
 Epidendrum trachypus F.Lehm. & Kraenzl., (1899).
 Epidendrum trachysepalum Hágsater, (1992) : Rough-surfaced Sepal Epidendrum
 Epidendrum trachythece Schltr., (1907).
 Epidendrum transversellipticum Hágsater,  (2001).
 Epidendrum transversovatum Hágsater & Dodson, 3 (2001).
 Epidendrum trialatum Hágsater, (1984) : Three-winged Epidendrum
 Epidendrum triangulabium Ames & C.Schweinf., (1930).
 Epidendrum trianthum Schltr., (1923).
 Epidendrum tricarinatum Rolfe, (1917).
 Epidendrum trichopetalum Schltr., (1913).
 Epidendrum tricrure Rchb.f. & Warsz., (1854). Subgen. Amphiglottium, Sect. Schistochila, Subs. Tuberculata (Reichenbach, p. 396)
 Epidendrum tridactylum Lindl., (1838) : Three-fingered Epidendrum
 Epidendrum tridens Poepp. & Endl., (1836).
 Epidendrum trifidum Schltr., (1920).
 Epidendrum triflorum Ruiz & Pav., (1798).
 Epidendrum trilobochilum Hágsater & Dodson, (2001).
 Epidendrum trimeroglossum Schltr., (1920).
 Epidendrum triodon Hágsater & Dodson, (2001).
 Epidendrum tropidioides Garay, (1978).
 Epidendrum troxalis Luer, (1981).
 Epidendrum trullichilum Hágsater & Dodson, (1999).
 Epidendrum trulliforme Garay & Dunst., (1976).
 Epidendrum turialvae Rchb.f., (1871).
 Epidendrum tuxtlense Hágsater, García-Cruz & L.Sánchez, (1999).
 Epidendrum tziscaoense Hágsater, (1999).

U 

 Epidendrum uleinanodes Hágsater, (1999) : Ule's Dwarf-like Epidendrum
 Epidendrum umbelliferum J.F.Gmel., (1791) :  Umbrella Epidendrum
 Epidendrum uncinatum D.E.Benn. & Christenson, (1998).
 Epidendrum unguiculatum (C.Schweinf.) Garay & Dunst., (1976).
 Epidendrum unifoliatum Schltr., (1921).
 Epidendrum upanodifforme Hágsater & Dodson, (1999).
 Epidendrum uribei A.D.Hawkes, (1957).
 Epidendrum urichianum Carnevali, Foldats & I.Ramírez, (1992).
 Epidendrum urraoense Hágsater, (1999).
 Epidendrum urubambae Hágsater, (2001).
 Epidendrum utcuyacuense Hágsater, (1993).

V 

 Epidendrum vandifolium Lindl.,  (1849) : Durango Epidendrum
 Epidendrum vareschii Foldats, (1969).
 Epidendrum vargasii Christenson & Nauray, (2001).
 Epidendrum vellozoi A.D.Hawkes, (1957).
 Epidendrum ventricosum Lindl., (1841).
 Epidendrum veraguasense Hágsater, (1992).
 Epidendrum vernixium Rchb.f. & Warsz., (1854).
 Epidendrum veroreveloi Hágsater & Dodson, (2001).
 Epidendrum veroscriptum Hágsater, (1993) : Lettered Epidendrum
 Epidendrum vesicatum Lindl., (1838).
 Epidendrum vesicicaule L.O.Williams, (1940).
 Epidendrum vexillium Hágsater, (1999).
 Epidendrum vidal-senegei Hágsater, (1999).
 Epidendrum vieirae Hágsater, (1993).
 Epidendrum vigiaense I.Bock, (1982).
 Epidendrum villegastigma Hágsater & García-Cruz, (1999).
 Epidendrum villotae Hágsater & Dodson, (1999).
 Epidendrum vincentinum Lindl., (1841).
 Epidendrum violascens Ridl., (1887).
 Epidendrum violetense Hágsater & Dodson, (2001).
 Epidendrum viride Ruiz & Pav. (1798).
 Epidendrum viridibrunneum Rchb.f., (1862).
 Epidendrum viridifuscatum De Wild., (1904).
 Epidendrum viviparum Lindl., (1841).
 Epidendrum volubile Ruiz & Pav. (1798).
 Epidendrum volutum Lindl. & Paxton, (1852) : Rolled-petal Epidendrum
 Epidendrum vulcanicola A.H.Heller, (1968).
 Epidendrum vulcanicum Schltr., (1924).

W 

 Epidendrum warrasii Pabst, (1971) : Warras' Epidendrum
 Epidendrum warszewiczii Rchb.f., (1852).
 Epidendrum watsonianum Sander, (1892).
 Epidendrum weberbauerianum Kraenzl., (1905).
 Epidendrum welsii-windischii Pabst, (1975).
 Epidendrum wendtii Hágsater & Salazar, (1999).
 Epidendrum werffii Dodson & Hágsater, (1989).
 Epidendrum werneri Schltr., (1924).
 Epidendrum whittenii Hágsater & Dodson, (1999) : Whitten's Epidendrum
 Epidendrum wigginsii Hágsater & Dodson, (2001).
 Epidendrum williamsii Dodson, (1977).
 Epidendrum woytkowskianum A.D.Hawkes, (1957).
 Epidendrum wrightii Lindl., (1858) : Wright's Epidendrum

X

 Epidendrum xanthinum Lindl., (1844) : Yellow Epidendrum. Subgen. Amphiglottium, Sect. Schistochila, Subs. Tuberculata (Reichenbach, p. 395)
 Epidendrum xanthoianthinum Hágsater, (1993).
 Epidendrum xantholeucum Rchb.f., (1850).
 Epidendrum xylostachyum Lindl., (1845). Subgenus Epidendrum Lindl. Section Planifolia Rchb.f. Subsection Spathacea Rchb.f. (Reichenbach p. 400)
 Epidendrum xytriophorum Rchb.f. & Warsz., (1854). Subgen. Amphiglottium, Sect. Schistochila, Subs. Tuberculata (Reichenbach, p. 394)

Y 

 Epidendrum yambalense Hágsater & Dodson, (1993).
 Epidendrum yambrasbambense Hágsater, (2001).
 Epidendrum yaracuyense Carnevali & G.A.Romero in G.A.Romero & G.Carnevali, (2000).
 Epidendrum yungasense Rolfe ex Rusby, (1895).

Z 

 Epidendrum zamorense Hágsater & Dodson, (1993).
 Epidendrum zappii Pabst, (1976).
 Epidendrum zarumense Hágsater & Dodson, (1993).
 Epidendrum zingiberaceum Schltr., (1921).
 Epidendrum zosterifolium F.Lehm. & Kraenzl., (1899).

References 

 Orchid Research Newsletter 47, Royal Botanical Gardens, Kew, January 2006
 H. G. Reichenbach "Orchides" in C. Müller, Ed. Walpers. Annales Botanices Systematicae. 6(1861)309—417. Berlin.

External links 

Lists of plant species